{{safesubst:#invoke:RfD|||month = March
|day = 19
|year = 2023
|time = 13:47
|timestamp = 20230319134707

|content=
REDIRECT Vokal (fashion brand)

}}